One third of North Hertfordshire District Council in England is elected each year, followed by one year without election.

Political control
Since the first election to the council in 1973 political control of the council has been held by the following parties:

Leadership
The leaders of the council since 1974 (formally the chair of the policy and resources committee prior to the Local Government Act 2000) have been:

Council elections
1973 North Hertfordshire District Council election
1976 North Hertfordshire District Council election
1979 North Hertfordshire District Council election (New ward boundaries)
1980 North Hertfordshire District Council election
1982 North Hertfordshire District Council election
1983 North Hertfordshire District Council election
1984 North Hertfordshire District Council election
1986 North Hertfordshire District Council election
1987 North Hertfordshire District Council election
1988 North Hertfordshire District Council election
1990 North Hertfordshire District Council election (District boundary changes took place but the number of seats remained the same)
1991 North Hertfordshire District Council election
1992 North Hertfordshire District Council election
1994 North Hertfordshire District Council election
1995 North Hertfordshire District Council election
1996 North Hertfordshire District Council election
1998 North Hertfordshire District Council election
1999 North Hertfordshire District Council election (New ward boundaries)
2000 North Hertfordshire District Council election
2002 North Hertfordshire District Council election
2003 North Hertfordshire District Council election
2004 North Hertfordshire District Council election
2006 North Hertfordshire District Council election
2007 North Hertfordshire District Council election (New ward boundaries)
2008 North Hertfordshire District Council election
2010 North Hertfordshire District Council election
2011 North Hertfordshire District Council election
2012 North Hertfordshire District Council election
2014 North Hertfordshire District Council election
2015 North Hertfordshire District Council election
2016 North Hertfordshire District Council election
2018 North Hertfordshire District Council election
2019 North Hertfordshire District Council election
2021 North Hertfordshire District Council election
2022 North Hertfordshire District Council election

By-election results

References

 North Hertfordshire election results
 By-election results

External links
North Hertfordshire District Council

 
Local elections
Council elections in Hertfordshire
District council elections in England